Jiangnan is the region south of the lower reaches of the Yangtze River in China.

Jiangnan may also refer to:

Places

Historical

People

Other uses

 Jiangnan Automobile, a automobile manufacturing company, headquartered in Xiangtan, China

See also
 Gangnam (disambiguation), Korean equivalent
 Ying Nan, a fictional character in the Marvel Cinematic Universe
 江南 (disambiguation)

ko:강남
ja:江南
vi:Giang Nam (định hướng)
zh:江南 (消歧义)